Sipayi Chinnayya is a 1969 Telugu-language drama film produced by D. Ramanaidu under the Suresh Productions banner and directed by G. V. R. Seshagiri Rao. It stars Akkineni Nageswara Rao, K. R. Vijaya and Bharathi, with music composed by M. S. Viswanathan.

Plot
The film revolves around Zamindary family, it's heir Captain Bhaskar (Akkineni Nageswara Rao) joins in Indian Navy along with Sipayi Chinnayya (again Akkineni Nageswara Rao) a pleb, belongs to the same village who are good friends and surprisingly, both of them resemble each other. After return, Bhaskar's younger brother Shekar (Jaggayya) and mother Subhadramma (Pandari Bai) gives him warm welcome. Here everyone's hearts are delightful except Zamindar's step-brother Kodandam (Prabhakar Reddy) a vicious person, who is malevolent towards Bhaskar for the property. Eventually, Bhaskar loves his cousin Shobha (Bharati) and elders fix their alliance. Chinnaiah leads a happy family life with his wife Kannamma (K.R.Vijaya) and all the villagers credit him for his amiable nature except a goon Ganganna (Satyanarayana), the henchmen of Kodandam. Ahead, though Bhaskar is a good-humane, Shekar is furious & wild who thinks penniless as baseness also suffers insolvents by making them impoverished. Aware of it, Chinnaiah abuses Shekar when angered Bhaskar slaps him, later he repents and reaches the village along with Manager Chokka Rao (Nagabhushanam) to apologize when Bhaskar presents Chinnaiah some sweets in which he secretly places some amount to clear the debts of villagers. Thereafter, Bhaskar wants to go for a ride into the sea when Chinnaiah says he will be back in a while. At that point in time, Ganganna seeks to slay Bhaskar by the instructions Kondandam, he backstabs and takes him to mid of the sea. Spotting it, Chinnaiah chases them but unfortunately, they stuck in the whirlpool.

Knowing the tragic event Subhadramma gets a heart attack and Kondandam ploys to grab the property. Simultaneously, Shekar files a case against Chinnaiah for slaughtering Bhaskar by showing the amount in the sweet box as a piece of evidence. Fortuitously, Chinnaiah floats to the shore, expresses his sorrow to Chokka Rao when Shekar understands the virtue of Chinnaiah and requests him to take Bhaskar's position to safeguard their mother & property. Due to loyalty, he accepts and withstands many turbulences even stands strong when villagers are converting his wife as a widow. Later he secretly reveals the facts to Kannamma and takes her to the palace which is witnessed by Ganganna who attributes illicit relationship between them. Here entire villagers denounce Kannamma where Chinnaiah stays in dilemma and not able to reveal the truth, in addition to that Subhadramma & Shobha also chide him when he silently divulges it to Shobha. Now the village head Peddaiah (Mikkilineni) forcibly makes remarriage arrangements of Kannamma with Ganganna. In that critical situation, like a godsend, Bhaskar is alive who is rescued by fishermen, but due to his hard time goes into the clutches of Kondandam when Shobha frees him and they rush to the estate. During the time of the wedding, Shekar & Chinnaiah reaches the venue when a clash arises and leads to severe destruction which calms down with Bhaskar's arrival. At last, Bhaskar & Chinnaiah sees the end of baddies. Finally, the movie ends on a happy note with the marriage of Bhaskar & Shobha.

Cast
Akkineni Nageswara Rao as Captain Bhaskar & Sipayi Chinnayya (Dual role)
K. R. Vijaya as Kannamma
Bharathi as Shobha
Jaggayya as Sekhar
Satyanarayana as Ganganna 
Nagabhushanam as Chokka Rao
Prabhakar Reddy as Kodandam
Mikkilineni as Peddaiah
Raja Babu as Amavasya
Raavi Kondala Rao as Kailasam
S. V. Ramadas as Inspector
D. Ramanaidu as Doctor (cameo)
Pandari Bai as Subhadramma
Rushyendramani as Chinnaiah's Bamma
L. Vijayalakshmi as item number
Vijaya Lalitha as item number

Crew
Art: Rajendra Kumar
Choreography: Chinni-Sampath, K. S. Reddy
Fights: Raghavulu
Lyrics: Arudra, Aatreya, Devulapalli, Dasarathi
Playback: Ghantasala, P. Susheela, L. R. Eeswari
Story: Turaiyur K. Murthy
Dialogues: Bhamidipati Radha Krishna
Music: M. S. Viswanathan
Cinematography: P. Bhaskara Rao
Editing: K. A. Marthand
Producer: D. Ramanaidu
Director: GVR Seshagiri Rao
Banner: Suresh Productions
Release Date: 30 October 1969

Soundtrack

Music composed by M. S. Viswanathan. The song Naa Janma Bhoomi is a blockbuster. Music released AVM Audio Company.

References

Indian drama films
Films scored by M. S. Viswanathan
1969 drama films
1969 films
Suresh Productions films